The 2015–16 Quinnipiac Bobcats men's basketball team represented Quinnipiac University during the 2015–16 NCAA Division I men's basketball season. The Bobcats, led by ninth year head coach Tom Moore, played their home games at the TD Bank Sports Center and were members of the Metro Atlantic Athletic Conference. They finished the season 9–21, 6–14 in MAAC play to finish in ninth place. They lost in the first round of the MAAC tournament to Rider.

Roster

Schedule

|-
!colspan=9 style="background:#003664; color:#C2980B;"| Regular season

|-
!colspan=9 style="background:#003664; color:#C2980B;"| MAAC tournament

References

Quinnipiac Bobcats men's basketball seasons
Quinnipiac
Quinnipiac Bobcats
Quinnipiac Bobcats